Chicken a La King is a 1928 American silent comedy film directed by Henry Lehrman and starring Nancy Carroll, George Meeker and Ford Sterling. The title is a reference to the dish Chicken à la King.

Synopsis
Concerned that her husband is spending too much time with a couple of chorus girls, his wife undergoes an expensive makeover.

Cast
 Nancy Carroll as Maisie Devoe  
 George Meeker as Buck Taylor  
 Ford Sterling as Horace Trundle  
 Arthur Stone as Oscar Barrows 
 Frances Lee as Babe Lorraine  
 Carol Holloway as Effie Trundle

Preservation status
The film is now lost.

References

Bibliography
 Solomon, Aubrey. The Fox Film Corporation, 1915-1935: A History and Filmography. McFarland, 2011.

External links

1928 films
1928 comedy films
Silent American comedy films
Films directed by Henry Lehrman
American silent feature films
1920s English-language films
Fox Film films
Films set in New York City
American black-and-white films
1920s American films